Anus, or Korur, is an Austronesian language spoken on an island in Jayapura Bay, east of the Tor River in Papua province of Indonesia. It is one of the Sarmi languages.

References

External links 
 PARADISEC collections with Anus recordings

Languages of western New Guinea
Sarmi–Jayapura languages
Endangered Austronesian languages